Pachysaga is a genus of insect in family Tettigoniidae.

Species 

The following species are recognised in the genus Pachysaga:

 Pachysaga australis (Walker, 1869)
 Pachysaga croceopteryx Rentz, 1993
 Pachysaga eneabba Rentz, 1993
 Pachysaga munggai Rentz, 1993
 Pachysaga ocrocercus Rentz, 1993
 Pachysaga strobila Rentz, 1993

References 

Tettigoniidae genera
Taxonomy articles created by Polbot